The PWS-54 was a Polish single-engine passenger and mail plane for three passengers; one alone was built in 1932 in the PWS factory.

Development
The aircraft was designed by Zbysław Ciołkosz for an order of the Ministry of Communication for a fast plane with higher performance than the PWS-24 airliner, for carrying mail or four passengers. Much attention was given to aerodynamics and the PWS-54 was  faster than PWS-24, which used the same engine. A prototype, built in 1932, was first flown in early 1933 at Biała Podlaska.

The PWS-54 was evaluated by LOT Polish Airlines from 1933 but after few years it was withdrawn from use and returned to the factory. The design was not quite successful; the main fault was too small a payload, which limited either its capacity or range. It was intended to carry four passengers but at this weight the range was too small to be useful, so it was completed with only three passenger seats. However, because of not too good handling it was not used to carry passengers at all but only for cargo and mail transport. It also had quite long landing run despite air brakes in landing gear covers. A modernized PWS-24bis with a more powerful engine offered the same performance.

Description

The PWS-57 was a high wing cantilever monoplane of mixed construction with an enclosed cockpit and single engine. Its fuselage was steel framed and fabric covered. Its one-piece wing, tapered with elliptical tips in plan, was built around two wooden box spars and covered with stressed plywood. The tail unit, like the fuselage, was steel framed and ply covered, with split, balanced elevators.  Fin and tailplane were externally braced together.

The single pilot was housed in a cockpit ahead of the wing, well glazed and with a pointed front windshield. Behind and slightly below the cockpit the passengers' cabin was accessed by a door on either side of the fuselage under the wing. Cockpit and cabin were separated but there was a sliding door, accessed by moving one of the forward passenger seats, to allow the pilot to get to the cockpit.

It was powered by a Wright Whirlwind J-5 of  take-off power and  nominal power, produced in the Polish Skoda Works as the Skoda-Wright J-5. This drove a two-blade metal propeller and was fitted with a Townend ring cowling. The PWS-54 had a conventional fixed undercarriage with a rear wheel. Each mainwheel was mounted on a V-form, steel tube strut hinged to the lower fuselage, with long, vertical shock absorber legs to the wings. The wheels were enclosed with spats that split into fore and aft sections for servicing.

Specifications

Notes

See also

References
Andrzej Glass: "Polskie konstrukcje lotnicze 1893-1939" (Polish aviation constructions 1893-1939), WKiŁ, Warsaw 1977 (Polish language, no ISBN)

External links

Photos and drawings at Ugolok Neba site

1930s Polish civil utility aircraft
PWS aircraft
Single-engined tractor aircraft
High-wing aircraft
Aircraft first flown in 1933